Loxosceles sonora is a species of venomous recluse spider in the family Sicariidae. It is an relative of the species L. deserta via allopatric speciation. The etymology of the species name is the Mexican state of Sonora. They are also found in the neighboring state of Sinaloa.

References

Sicariidae
Spiders of Mexico
Spiders described in 1980